Phryganopteryx rectangulata is a moth in the subfamily Arctiinae. It was described by George Hamilton Kenrick in 1914. It is found on Madagascar.

References

Moths described in 1914
Phryganopterygina